Richard Sommers Gard (1797 – 16 December 1868) was a British Conservative politician.

After failing at Honiton in 1852, Gard was elected Conservative MP for Exeter at the 1857 general election and held the seat until 1865 when he did not seek re-election at that year's general election.

References

External links
 

UK MPs 1857–1859
UK MPs 1859–1865
1797 births
1868 deaths
Conservative Party (UK) MPs for English constituencies
Members of the Parliament of the United Kingdom for Exeter